Mario Verzeletti (born 17 May 1893, date of death unknown) was an Italian racing cyclist. He rode in the 1921 Tour de France.

References

External links
 

1893 births
Year of death missing
Italian male cyclists
Place of birth missing
Cyclists from the Province of Brescia